Fred Oberlander (23 May 1911 – 6 July 1996) was an Austrian, British, and Canadian wrestler. He was born in Vienna, Austria. He won the World Championships in 1935. Oberlander was offered a chance to compete for Austria at the 1936 Summer Olympics in Nazi Germany, but declined. He represented Great Britain as team captain at the 1948 Summer Olympics. Oberlander later emigrated to Canada, where he founded the Canadian Maccabi Association. He won a silver medal in wrestling at the 1950 Maccabiah Games, and the heavyweight wrestling title at the 1953 Maccabiah Games and was named Outstanding Jewish World Athlete.

Hall of Fame
Oberlander was named to the International Jewish Sports Hall of Fame in 1991.

Family
His son Ron served as President and CEO of Abitibi Consolidated. His son Philip followed in his father's footsteps, wrestling as a welterweight in the 1964 Tokyo Olympics, but did not win a medal.

See also
List of select Jewish wrestlers

References

1911 births
1996 deaths
Austrian male sport wrestlers
British male sport wrestlers
Canadian male sport wrestlers
Olympic wrestlers of Great Britain
Wrestlers at the 1948 Summer Olympics
Sportspeople from Vienna
Austrian Jews
English Jews
Jewish Canadian sportspeople
Jewish wrestlers
Maccabiah Games silver medalists for Canada
Maccabiah Games gold medalists for Canada
World Wrestling Champions
Maccabiah Games medalists in wrestling
Competitors at the 1950 Maccabiah Games
Competitors at the 1953 Maccabiah Games